Carpathonesticus eriashvilii  is an araneomorph spider species of the family Nesticidae. It occurs in Georgia, in the Lagodekhi Nature Reserve.

Original publication

References 

Nesticidae
Spiders of Georgia (country)
Spiders described in 1987